Spirobolus greeni, is a species of round-backed millipede in the family Spirobolidae. It is endemic to Sri Lanka, first found from Pundaloya, Nuwara Eliya.

References

Spirobolida
Endemic fauna of Sri Lanka
Millipedes of Asia
Animals described in 1892